Kyd Island is an island of the Andaman Islands. It belongs to the South Andaman administrative district, part of the Indian union territory of Andaman and Nicobar Islands.

Geography
The island belongs to the Napier Bay Islands and lies north of Shoal Bay.

Administration
Politically, Kyd Island, along with the neighbouring Napier Bay Islands, is part of Ferrargunj Taluk.

Demographics
The island was formerly inhabited.

An Andamani group of inhabitants 'Aca-Bea' used to live on Kyd Island.

References 

Islands of South Andaman district
Uninhabited islands of India
Islands of India
Islands of the Bay of Bengal